is a Japanese football player as Midfielder. He currently play for Tochigi City FC.

Career 

Paulo Junichi Tanaka begin first youth career with Osaka Toin Junior & Senior High School from 2009 until he was graduation in 2011.

On 18 November 2011, Paulo Junichi Tanaka begin first professional career with Kawasaki Frontale from 2012. He left from the club in 2013 after two years at Kawasaki.

On 14 January 2014, Tanaka sign transfer to J3 new member club, Zweigen Kanazawa for ahead 2014 season. He was participated in 24 games, mainly as a substitute, and contributed to the team's victory in J3 and promotion to J2. He left from the club in 2015 after two years at Kanazawa.

On 22 December 2015, Tanaka transferred to J2 club, FC Gifu from 2016. He left from the club in 2018 after three years at Gifu.

On 23 December 2018, Tanaka officially joined to J2 club, Renofa Yamaguchi for upcoming 2019 season. He left from the club in 2013 after two years at Yamaguchi.

On 23 December 2020, Tanaka announcement officially transfer to J2 club, Matsumoto Yamaga for upcoming 2021 season. On 24 November 2022, he leave from the club in 2022 after two years at Matsumoto has been expiration cause not renewal contract.

On 3 February 2023, Tanaka announcement officially transfer to Kantō Soccer League club, Tochigi City FC for ahead of 2023 season.

Personal life 

His mother is Filipino from Cotabato, while his father is a Japanese from the Hyogo Prefecture. He is active in YouTube and TikTok.

Career statistics

Club 

Updated to the start of 2023 season.

Honours
 Zweigen Kanazawa

 J3 League: 2014
 Ishikawa Football Championship: 2014

 Matsumoto Yamaga

 Nagano Football Championship: 2022

References

External links
 Paulo Junichi Tanaka at j-league.or.jp 
 Paulo Junichi Tanaka at jleague.jp (archive) 
 Paulo Junichi Tanaka at FC Gifu (archived) 

1993 births
Living people
Association football people from Hyōgo Prefecture
Japanese footballers
J1 League players
J2 League players
J3 League players
Kawasaki Frontale players
Zweigen Kanazawa players
FC Gifu players
Renofa Yamaguchi FC players
Matsumoto Yamaga FC players
Tochigi City FC players
Association football midfielders
Japanese people of Filipino descent